Burial of a Potato is a 1990 Polish drama film directed by Jan Jakub Kolski. It was screened in the Un Certain Regard section at the 1991 Cannes Film Festival.

Cast
 Franciszek Pieczka - Mateusz Szewczyk
 Adam Ferency - Stefan Gorzelak
 Mariusz Saniternik - Pasiasia
 Ewa Zukowska - Mierzwowa
 Grażyna Błęcka-Kolska - Dziedziczka Lachowiczowa
 Bogusław Sochnacki - Mazurek
 Grzegorz Herominski - Wladzio Rzepecki
 Feliks Szajnert - Antoni Andrzejewski
 Katarzyna Laniewska - Mazurkowa
 Irena Burawska - Kusidelka
 Henryk Niebudek - Kapitan
 Andrzej Jurczak - Mierzwa
 Krystyna Feldman - Matka Gorzelaka
 Joanna Jankowska-Hussakowska - Hanka
 Jan Jankowski - Jurek Szewczyk, Mateusz's son
 Lech Gwit - Geometra Franus

References

External links
 

1990 films
1990 drama films
Polish drama films
1990s Polish-language films
Films directed by Jan Jakub Kolski